Macrophthalmus quadratus is a species of crab in the family Macrophthalmidae. It was described by A. Milne-Edwards in 1873.

References

Ocypodoidea
Crustaceans described in 1873